Ten Thousand Bars is the eighth album, and the sixth studio album, by Ezio, released in 2006.

Track listing

All songs written by Ezio Lunedei.

"All I really want" – 3:11
"Thin line" – 5:14
"Mandolin song" – 3:01
"Hotel Motel" – 2:43
"Holding you now"  - 4:11
"All for you" – 3:57
"Ten thousand bars" – 3:42
"I want you back" – 3:47
"Friends again" – 5:41
"Woohoohoo" – 4:26
"Call me up" – 5:03
"If you want to go" – 4:09
"Circus revisited" – 3:06

Credits 
Ezio – guitar, vocals
Booga – guitar
Lidia Cascarino – bass
Alex Reeves – drums
Lee Russell – percussion
Guest performances from :
Peter van Hooke - drums
Ian Close
Tiffany Gore - vocals
Rebecca Hayne

Production
Produced and engineered by Lee Russell at Dulcitone
Additional engineering and mixing by Graham Bonnett
Artwork by Lena Rocker

See also
2006 in music

2006 albums
Ezio (band) albums
Tapete Records albums